Aristolebia is a genus of beetles in the family Carabidae.

Species 
Aristolebia contains the following twenty-four species:

Aristolebia apicalis Baehr, 2010
Aristolebia baehri Hovorka, 2020
Aristolebia bastai Baehr, 2017
Aristolebia capitis Darlington, 1968
Aristolebia coptoderopsis (Burgeon, 1937)
Aristolebia crucigera Baehr, 2004
Aristolebia davaonis (Heller, 1921)
Aristolebia flavipennis Baehr, 2017
Aristolebia floreana Baehr, 2011
Aristolebia indica Kirschenhofer, 2011
Aristolebia klimenkoi Anichtchenko, 2017
Aristolebia laosensis Baehr, 2017
Aristolebia lemoulti (Basilewsky, 1948)
Aristolebia mucronata (Sloane, 1907)
Aristolebia oculata Baehr, 2010
Aristolebia paracrucigera Baehr, 2011
Aristolebia prattiana (Bates, 1889)
Aristolebia quadridentata Bates, 1892
Aristolebia rubiginosa Kirschenhofer, 2012
Aristolebia rutilipennis Baehr, 2015
Aristolebia saluki Anichtchenko, 2017
Aristolebia timorensis Baehr, 2017
Aristolebia triramosa Baehr, 2010
Aristolebia wau Darlington, 1968

References

Lebiinae